Sascha Herröder (born April 18, 1988) is a German retired footballer.

External links

Sascha Herröder at Kicker

1988 births
Living people
German footballers
SV Darmstadt 98 players
SV Elversberg players
Eintracht Frankfurt II players
VfR Aalen players
Alemannia Aachen players
Sportfreunde Lotte players
SG Sonnenhof Großaspach players
3. Liga players
Regionalliga players
Association football central defenders
SpVgg Unterhaching II players
People from Groß-Gerau
Sportspeople from Darmstadt (region)
Footballers from Hesse